The 2014 Yingjiang earthquake occurred on 24 May at  in Yingjiang County, Yunnan Province, China, with a moment magnitude of 5.6  and a maximum perceived intensity of VII (Very strong) on the Mercalli intensity scale. The epicenter was in the town of Kachang. There were 14 aftershocks, according to the Yunnan provincial seismological bureau.

The earthquake affected about 23,800 people and destroyed 9,412 homes. More than 8,000 people were evacuated and a power outage occurred around the epicenter. The Yunnan region is seismically active, lying within the complex zone of deformation caused by the ongoing collision between the Eurasian Plate and Indian Plate.

Relief
Three relocation sites were set up for 8,465 displaced residents. The provincial seismological bureau dispatched a work team of 50 people for surveying, investigation and disaster assessment. The Yunnan Provincial Civil Affairs Department sent 1,600 tents, 2,000 quilts and 1,000 folding beds to affected areas.

See also
 List of earthquakes in 2014
 List of earthquakes in China
 List of earthquakes in Myanmar

References

External links

Yingjiang
Yingjiang
Earthquakes in Yunnan
Earthquakes in China
2014 in China
Geography of Dehong Dai and Jingpo Autonomous Prefecture
Earthquakes in Myanmar